Jolanta Dičkutė (born December 8, 1970 in Kaunas) is a Lithuanian politician and Member of the European Parliament for the Labour Party; part of the Alliance of Liberals and Democrats for Europe. She was studying at the Kaunas Medical University from 1989 to 2002 to earn PhD in public health.

References

External links
 Personal website

1970 births
Living people
Politicians from Kaunas
Labour Party (Lithuania) MEPs
MEPs for Lithuania 2004–2009
Women MEPs for Lithuania
21st-century Lithuanian politicians